Brynafan is a small village in the community of Trawsgoed, Ceredigion, Wales, which is 66.7 miles (107.3 km) from Cardiff and 170.3 miles (274.1 km) from London. Brynafan is represented in the Senedd by Elin Jones (Plaid Cymru) and is part of the Ceredigion constituency in the House of Commons.

References

See also 
 List of localities in Wales by population 

Villages in Ceredigion